Vat Phou (or Vat Phu;   temple-mountain) is a ruined Khmer Hindu temple complex in southern Laos and one of the oldest places of worship in Southeast Asia.

There was a sanctuary on the site centred on a sacred spring and an offering place for a mighty tutelary sprit dating back to pre-historic times. The first megalithic stone structures had been built probably as early as the second century BCE, consisting of two stone cells, a carving of a crocodile, a serpent stairs and several offering platforms. One of the first pre-Angkor brick buildings onsite was erected in the early 7th century and became the focus of all consequent building activities. Most of the other surviving buildings date from the Angkor period in the 11th to 13th centuries.

History

Vat Phou was initially associated with the city of Shrestapura, which lay on the bank of the Mekong directly east of Lingaparvata Mountain (now called Phou Khao). By the latter part of the fifth century, the city was the capital of a kingdom that texts and inscriptions connect with the Chenla Kingdom and Champa. The first structure on the mountain was constructed around this time. The mountain gained spiritual importance from the lingam-shaped protuberance on its summit. The mountain itself was, therefore, considered the home of Shiva, and the river as representing the ocean or the Ganges. 

Vat Phou was a part of the Khmer Empire centred on Angkor to the southwest, at least as early as the reign of Yasovarman I in the early 10th century. Shrestapura was superseded by a new city in the Angkorian period, directly south of the temple. In the later period, the original buildings were replaced, re-using some of the stone blocks; the temple now seen was built primarily during the Koh Ker and Baphuon periods of the 11th century. Minor changes were made during the following two centuries, before the temple, like most in the empire, was converted to Theravada Buddhist use.

This continued after the area came under control of the Lao, and a festival is held on the site each February. Little restoration work has been done, other than the restoration of boundary posts along the path. Vat Phou was designated a World Heritage Site in 2001.

Site

Like most Khmer temples, Vat Phou is oriented towards the east, although the axis faces eight degrees south of due east, being determined primarily by the orientation of the mountain and the river.

Approached from the city (of which little remains), the first part of the temple reached is a series of barays. Only one now contains water, the 600 by 200 m middle baray which lies directly along the temple's axis; there were reservoirs north and south of this, and a further pair on each side of the causeway between the middle baray and the palaces.

The two palaces stand on a terrace on either side of the axis. They are known as the north and south palaces or, without any evidence, the men's and women's palaces (the term "palace" is a mere convention and their purpose is unknown). Each consisted of a rectangular courtyard with a corridor and entrance on the side towards the axis, and false doors at the east and west ends. The courtyards of both buildings have laterite walls. The walls of the northern palace's corridor are laterite, while those of the southern palace are sandstone. The northern building is now in better condition. The palaces are notable chiefly for their pediments and lintels, which are in the early Angkor Wat style.

The next terrace has a small shrine to Nandi (Shiva's mount) to the south, in poor condition. The road connecting Vat Phou to Angkor ran south from this temple. Continuing west, successive staircases lead up further terraces; between them stands a dvarapala which has come to be worshiped as king Kammatha, mythical builder of the temple. On the narrow next terrace are the remains of six small shrines destroyed by treasure-hunters.

The path culminates in seven sandstone tiers which rise to the upper terrace and central sanctuary. The sanctuary is in two parts. The front section, of sandstone, is now occupied by four Buddha images, while the brick rear part, which formerly contained the central lingam, is empty.

The entire roof is missing, although a makeshift covering has been added to the front. Water from the spring which emerges from the cliff about 60 m southwest of the sanctuary was channeled along stone aqueducts into the rear chamber, continuously bathing the lingam. The sanctuary is later than the north and south palaces, belonging to the Baphuon period of the later 11th century. The east side has three doorways: from south to north, their pediments show Krishna defeating the nāga Kaliya; Indra riding Airavata; and Vishnu riding Garuda. The east wall bears dvarapalas and devatas. Entrances to the south and north have inner and outer lintels, including one to the south of Krishna ripping Kamsa apart.

Other features of the area are a library, in poor condition, south of the sanctuary, and a relief of the Trimurti to the northwest. There are other carvings further north: a Buddha footprint on the cliff face and boulders shaped to resemble elephants and a crocodile. The crocodile stone has acquired some notoriety as being possibly the site of an annual human sacrifice described in a sixth-century Chinese text. The identification is lent some plausibility by the similarity of the crocodile's dimensions to those of a human.

The most remarkable feature of the Vat Phou complex is that it shows the development of the Khmer stone architecture from its earliest beginnings until the 13th century.

Conservation projects 
After the first scientific description on the late 19th and early 20th century there was little scientific activity at the site until the early 1990s. With the Lao-UNESCO projects starting in 1987 and the designation as UNESCO World Heritage Site in 2001 archeologic and conservation activities increased heavily. Examples of the most recent conservation projects are:
 Global Heritage Fund, in association with the Lerici Institute (Italy) and the government of Laos, is providing emergency conservation of temple structures at this largest of archaeological sites in Laos. The stabilization and sustained conservation of Nandin Hall is the primary focus of these efforts. However, the Global Heritage Fund-led team is working with local communities for training and development.
 2005-2012: French-Lao cooperation project (French Ministry of Foreign and European Affairs / Lao Ministryof Information and Culture): Priority Solidarity Funds "Vat Phou-Champasak, enhancement and development of the historical and cultural heritage" (FSP 2005-75). This project included restoration of the northern hall of the southern quadrangle (palace), cultural project on the intangible heritage of Champasak: Rediscovery of the Champasak Shadow Puppet Theatre and organization of a theatre tour in the villages of the district of Champasak accompanied by Cinema Tuk-tuk, Layout of the 'Sala' and surroundings of Vat Phou site. Objectives of the project were: institutional support for the creation of a body specialized management of the site, training of the scientific, technical and administrative staff, and development of the site and its economic valuation.
 2006: Restoration project for the temple of Nandin by the Italian mission
 2009: Restoration project for the northern palace by the Archaeological Survey of India (ASI). The Indian Team from Archaeological survey of India, headed by R. S. Jamwal, conducted studies of foundations, drainage problems, super structural elements as well as did the documentation, recording, survey work etc. for the Northern Quadrangle of temple complex. The conservation and Restoration work of Northern Quadrangle is likely to be commenced from ensuing working season.
 2010: Restoration project for the southern palace, with Jean-Marc Houlteau, stonemason.
 2011: Restoration project for the southern quadrangle (palace), with Jean-Marc Simon-Bernardini and Johann Gautreau, stonemasons.
 2014: Non-intrusive stone analyses, by Christian Fischer.

Presentation and visits 
Today the site is open to the public for religious activities and tourist visits. Hours are 08:00–18:00, and the entrance fee is 50,000 LAK for foreigners and 20,000 LAK for locals.

The site features a museum which houses artifacts of the temple complex of several centuries, such as statues of Shiva, Vishnu and Nandin, as well as Buddhist statues. The museum building has been limited to a specific size to minimize altering the underground site and the view.

Notes

 Projet de Recherches en Archaeologie Lao. Vat Phu: The Ancient City, The Sanctuary, The Spring (pamphlet).
 Freeman, A Guide to Khmer Temples in Thailand and Laos p. 200-201.
 ICOMOS report p. 71.
 ICOMOS report p. 72.
 Global Heritage Fund - Where We Work - Wat Phu, Laos Accessed on 2009-04-28.
 Global Heritage Fund - Where We Work - Wat Phu, Laos Accessed on 2009-04-28.

References
 É. Aymonier, Le Cambodge. II Les provinces siamoises, Paris 1901; 
 E. Lunet de Lajonquiére, Inventaire descriptif des monuments d’Indochine. Le Cambodge, II, Paris 1907; 
 H. Marchal, Le Temple de Vat Phou, province de Champassak, Éd. du département des Cultes du Gouvernement royal du Laos
 H Parmentier, «Le temple de Vat Phu», Bulletin de l’École Française d’Extrême-Orient, 14/2, 1914, p. 1-31; 
 M. Freeman, A Guide to Khmer Temples in Thailand and Laos. Weatherhill 1996. .
 M. Santoni et al., «Excavations at Champasak and Wat Phu (Southern Laos) », in R. Ciarla, F. Rispoli (ed.), South-East Asian Archaeology 1992, Roma 1997, p. 233-63; 
 M. Cucarzi, O. Nalesini et al., «Carta archeologica informatizzata: il progetto UNESCO per l’area di Wat Phu», in B. Amendolea (ed.), Carta archeologica e pianificazione territoriale, Roma 1999, p. 264-71;
 UNESCO Champasak Heritage Management Plan, Bangkok 1999 ;
 International Council on Monuments and Sites report on World Heritage Site application, September 2001;
 O. Nalesini, «Wat Phu», in Enciclopedia archeologica. Asia, Roma 2005.
 Ch. Higham. The Civilization of Angkor. Phoenix 2001. .
 Projet de Recherches en Archaeologie Lao. Vat Phu: The Ancient City, The Sanctuary, The Spring (pamphlet).
 Global Heritage Fund - Where We Work - Wat Phu, Laos Accessed on 2009-04-28.
 Recherches nouvelles sur le Laos - EFEO(école française d'extrême orient) - Yves Goudineau & Michel Lorrillard - 2008 - 678 pages.
 Gabel, J. 2022 Earliest Khmer Stone Architecture and its Origin: A Case Study of Megalithic Remains and Spirit Belief at the Site of Vat Phu. In: JoGA 2022: § 1–200

External links
 Official Vat Phu Website - history, timetable, news, projects, and more
Wat Phu preservation project summary at Global Heritage Fund
Explore Wat Phu with Google Earth on Global Heritage Network
Laos Travel Guide Wat Phu Champasak

Buddhist temples in Laos
Hindu temples in Laos
World Heritage Sites in Laos
Buildings and structures in Champasak province
5th-century Hindu temples
5th-century establishments
Angkorian sites in Laos